North Wembley is a district in North West London, England. It is located in the London Borough of Brent and is mostly made up of the 1930s Sudbury Court Estate. North Wembley forms the north-western part of the district of that is its namesake. The major roads in the area are East Lane, Watford Road, and Sudbury Court Drive. Most of it is part of the Wembley HA0 postcode area, but a small part in the east (including East Lane Business Park) falls under Wembley HA9, and parts in the west (including Sudbury Court Drive) fall under Harrow HA1.

History
Sudbury Court Estate was built between circa 1927 to 1935, one of the best surviving mock tudor housing in the wider area. The estate was built under Captain Edward George Spencer-Churchill, first cousin of Winston Churchill.

Geography and Demography
North Wembley on average is home to a richer population than Wembley Central but the part of district that is within the Preston ward (and thus not in the Sudbury Court Estate) has a few small council estates, blocks and many working-class people.

Along East Lane, an east–west street which run through the neighbourhood, is Wembley High secondary school, as well as a small selection of shops. It also contains East Lane Business Park which contains numerous skill labourers and office spaces; adjacent to that area is Hirst Crescent which is a collection low-rise flats stretching into Preston. The district is home to many ethnicities, with a significant Indian community in North Wembley as well as a smaller black population with Afro-Caribbeans being larger than African, and also an elderly White British population.

North Wembley has a leisure centre called Vale Farm, as well as a relatively large sports ground adjacent to it. North Wembley also provides the only vehicular access directly into Northwick Park.

To the north, the Watford Road leads to Harrow; to its west is Sudbury Hill and Harrow on the Hill; to the south is Sudbury and Wembley proper; and to the east is Wembley Park. Due to proximity with Sudbury, certain areas of North Wembley are informally referred to as being a part of Sudbury.

Transport (Transport for London)
North Wembley station is on the Bakerloo line and Watford DC line, but for many residents, depending where they live, either South Kenton station, Sudbury Hill Harrow station or Sudbury & Harrow Road station could be nearer.

London Buses routes 182, 245 and 483 (and night route N18) serve North Wembley, providing links to Wembley town centre, Sudbury, Harrow and Wembley Park. In addition, routes 92 and H17 pass by the very western end at Sudbury Court Drive; and route 223 passes by across the rail tracks by South Kenton station.

Schools
Wembley High Technology College

Gallery

References

Areas of London
Districts of the London Borough of Brent